Cindy Werley (born February 26, 1975 in Allentown, Pennsylvania) is a former Olympic field hockey forward from the United States, who made her international debut for the Women's National Team in 1994.  She was a member of the American team that competed at the 1996 Summer Olympics in Atlanta, Georgia.
She won a bronze medal at the 1995 Pan American Games.

Early life and education
Werley attended Emmaus High School in Emmaus, Pennsylvania, where she was a member of the Emmaus High School girls field hockey team, one of the best girls field hockey high school teams in the nation.

College 
Werley played field hockey on the collegiate level at the University of North Carolina, leading that team to two national championships. She won the Honda Sports Award as the nation's best collegiate field hockey player in both 1996–97 and 1997–98. 

Werley graduated from the University of North Carolina in 1998.

International senior tournaments
1995 – Pan American Games, Mar del Plata, Argentina (2nd place)
1995 – Champions Trophy, Mar del Plata, Argentina (3rd place)
1996 – Summer Olympics, Atlanta, United States (5th place)
1999 – Pan American Games, Winnipeg, Manitoba, Canada (2nd place)
1999 – Sydney International Hockey Challenge, Sydney, Australia (2nd place)
2000 – Olympic Qualifying Tournament, Milton Keynes, England (6th place)

Collegiate and high school accomplishments

1992 – U.S. Under-21 Team.
1994, 1996 and 1997 – NFHCA All-American
1996–97 and 1997–98 – Honda Sports Award (field hockey) winner
1994, 1995 and 1997 – All-ACC Tournament
1994, 1996 and 1997 – All-ACC
1994, 1996 and 1997 – ACC Tournament "Most Valuable Player"
1996 and 1997 – ACC "Player of the Year"
1994, 1996 and 1997 – NCAA All-Tournament
1996 and 1997 – NCAA National Champion with University of North Carolina

References

External links
 

1975 births
Living people
American female field hockey players
Emmaus High School alumni
Field hockey players at the 1995 Pan American Games
Field hockey players at the 1999 Pan American Games
Field hockey players at the 1996 Summer Olympics
Medalists at the 1995 Pan American Games
Medalists at the 1999 Pan American Games
North Carolina Tar Heels field hockey players
Olympic field hockey players of the United States
Pan American Games medalists in field hockey
Pan American Games silver medalists for the United States
Sportspeople from Allentown, Pennsylvania